Attila is a popular masculine name in Central-Eastern Europe (primarily Hungary, Bulgaria and Chuvashia) and in Western Asia and South-Eastern Europe (primarily Turkey and Bulgaria). Another version of Attila in Hungary is Etele, the female equivalent of which is Etelka. Another version of Attila used in Turkish is Atilla.

Etymology
It has been traditionally claimed that the name Attila is formed from Gothic atta, meaning "father", through the diminutive suffix -ila, the "little father". Related names are not uncommon among Germanic peoples of the period, i. e. Ætla, Bishop of Dorchester. The Gothic etymology was proposed by Jacob Grimm and Wilhelm Grimm in the early 19th century. Tom Shippey argued that the Gothic etymology is a product of 19th century Germanic romantic philological revisionism.

Otto Maenchen-Helfen, who considered Gothic etymology, noted that Hunnic names were "not the true names of the Hun princes and lords. What we have are Hunnic names in Germanic dress, modified to fit the Gothic tongue, or popular Gothic etymologies, or both".

Hyun Jin Kim noted Attila has more natural and probable Turkic etymology. Omeljan Pritsak considered ̕Άττίλα (Attila) a composite title-name which derived from Turkic *es (great, old), and *t il (sea, ocean), and the suffix /a/. The stressed back syllabic til assimilated the front member es, so it became *as. It is a nominative, in form of attíl- (< *etsíl < *es tíl) with the meaning "the oceanic, universal ruler". Peter Golden, citing Pritsak, like László Rásonyi connected Attila's name with a note by Menander in which the term Attilan was used as the name of the Volga River (Turkic Atil/Itil; "great river"). J.J. Mikkola connected it with Turkic āt (name, fame). Gerd Althoff considered it was related to Turkish atli (horseman, cavalier), or Turkish at (horse) and dil (tongue).

Given name

 Attila (died 453), ruler of the Huns
Saint Attila (937-1007), Aragonese bishop
 Atilla Altıkat (died 1982), Turkish diplomat
 Attila Ábrahám (born 1967), Hungarian sprint canoeist
 Attila Ambrus (born 1967), Hungarian bank robber
 Attila Aşkar (born 1943), Turkish mathematician and president of Koç University
 Attila Balázs (born 1989), Hungarian tennis player
Attila Barcza (born 1985). Hungarian politician
 Attila Szalai (born 1998), Hungarian footballer
 Attila Böjte (born 1976), Hungarian footballer
 Áttila de Carvalho (born 1910), known as Áttila, Brazilian international footballer
 Attila Csihar (born 1971), Hungarian musician
 Attila Csipler (1939–1996), Romanian fencer
Attila Cseke (born 1973), Hungarian politician in Romania
 Attila Czene (born 1974), Hungarian swimmer
 Attila Dargay (1927–2009), Hungarian animator
 Attila Demény, (1955–2021), Romanian composer and theatre director
 Attila Elek (born 1982), Hungarian ice dancer
 Atilla Engin (born 1946), Turkish American musician
 Attila Fekete (disambiguation)
 Attila Filkor (born 1988), Hungarian footballer
 Attila  Hejazi (born 1976), Iranian retired football player and coach.
 Attila Horváth (disambiguation)
 Attilâ İlhan (1925–2005), Turkish writer and poet
 Attila József (1905–1937), Hungarian poet
 Attila Kerekes (born 1954), Hungarian international footballer
 Attila Kovács (disambiguation)
 Attila Ladinsky (born 1949), nicknamed Le Gitan, Hungarian footballer
 Attila Losonczy (born 1974), Hungarian neuroscientist and Columbia University professor
Attila Mesterházy (born 1974), Hungarian politician
 Attila Özdemiroğlu (1943–2016), Turkish composer and arranger
Attila Péterffy (born 1969), Hungarian politician
 Atila Pesyani (born 1957), Iranian actor.
 Attila Petschauer (1904–1943), Hungarian 2x team Olympic champion saber fencer killed in the Holocaust
 Attila Pintér (disambiguation)
 Attila Sávolt (born 1976), Hungarian tennis player
 Attila Sekerlioglu (born 1965), Turkish footballer
 Attila Simon (disambiguation)
 Attila Szabó (disambiguation)
 Attila Szalay-Berzeviczy (born 1972),  Hungarian economist
 Attila Tököli (born 1976), Hungarian footballer
 Attila Zoller (1927–1998), Hungarian-born jazz musician
 Attila the Hun (calypsonian) (1892–1962), Trinidadian singer
 Attila the Stockbroker (born 1957), British punk poet

Other

 Attila (horse) (1839–1846), British thoroughbred racehorse and sire
 Louis Attila (1844–1924), name used by German-born American strongman Ludwig Durlacher

See also
 Attila (disambiguation)

References

Hungarian masculine given names
Turkish masculine given names